Drslavice is a municipality and village in Prachatice District in the South Bohemian Region of the Czech Republic. It has about 100 inhabitants.

Administrative parts
Villages and hamlets of Chválov, Škarez 1.díl, Švihov and Trpín are administrative parts of Drslavice.

References

Villages in Prachatice District